What Is Love? is the second studio album by British electronic music group Clean Bandit. It was released on 30 November 2018 by Atlantic Records. It includes the singles "Tears" (featuring Louisa Johnson), "Rockabye" (featuring Sean Paul and Anne-Marie), "Symphony" (featuring Zara Larsson), "I Miss You" (featuring Julia Michaels), "Solo" (featuring Demi Lovato), "Baby" (featuring Marina and Luis Fonsi) and "Mama" (featuring Ellie Goulding). In addition, the album also features collaborations with Rita Ora, Charli XCX, Bhad Bhabie and Tove Styrke. It is the band's first album as a trio, following the departure of multi-instrumentalist Neil Amin-Smith in 2016.

Background
Speaking about the gap between albums, bassist and saxophone player Jack Patterson told Fault magazine in late 2017: "It just takes us so much longer to create each piece of music. But our second one is nearly done – hopefully early next year." Cellist and vocalist Grace Chatto also explained that the album would be "more serious" as well as more "dancey" than 2014's New Eyes, saying: "I think the first album was a lot more light-hearted. While our second album, with the lyrics anyway, are more serious. Some of them are about breaking up, like 'I Miss You' and 'Tears', which are both on the album."

Jack later told The Guardian that a collaboration with Elton John did not make the album because the band "realised there was a sound developing in a certain part of the Venn diagram of the album and we wanted to push that. It was kind of this tropical, plastic-y, mournful sound, whereas his songs were more from the Rather Be world." A track was also recorded featuring Chatto's "childhood idol" Gwen Stefani but it "fell through", which Chatto called "devastating".

The album was part-recorded at The Crypt Studio, London.

Promotion
In September 2018, the group revealed through their social media accounts that they had been working with Rita Ora, and that recording for the album was finished. Several days later, they announced the title, track listing and artwork, as well as a statement on the themes: "The album looks at many different kinds and stages of love. We've been making it over three years, during which time we've all experienced love in our lives in different ways [...] brotherly love; family love; romantic love; crazy all-consuming love; the pain of love turning into something different or dishonest; and, of course, in Rockabye, unconditional motherly love."

Critical reception

Since release, What Is Love? has received generally positive reviews from music critics. According to review aggregation site Metacritic, the album has received an average score of 66/100 based on four reviews. Neil Z. Yeung reviewing for AllMusic gave the album 4 out of 5 stars, saying it was "worth the long wait" and that it took "the promise of Rather Be and [topped] it many times over."

Mark Beaumont of The Independent called What Is Love? "another album of formulaic EDM pop and Latino R&B dance floor grinders," while praising "Baby" as the record's stand-out track.

Track listing

Personnel and credits
Credits adapted from the liner notes of What Is Love?.

Musicians and technicians

 Jack Patterson – producer, mixing, piano, synths, vocals engineer, MIDI guitar, keyboards, trumpet, guitar synth, bass synth, flute, baritone saxophone, accordion, programming, electronic wind instrument
 Mark Ralph – producer, mixing, rhythm acoustic guitar, guitar, programming
 Grace Chatto – producer, cello, bass, synths, backing vocals, mixing, grand marimba
 Drew Smith – engineer
 Tom AD Fuller – engineer
 Zara Larsson – vocals
 Luke Patterson – percussion, drums, additional drum programming
 Kirsten Joy – backing vocals, vocals
 James Boyd – viola
 Stephanie Benedetti – violin
 Beatrice Philips – violin
 Liam Nolan – strings engineer
 Ray Charles Brown Jr – engineer, vocals engineer
 Greg Eliason – assistant engineer, assistant vocals engineer
 Ross Fortune – engineer
 Marina – vocals
 Luis Fonsi – vocals
 Mike Horner – vocals engineer, strings engineer
 Alex Robinson – assistant vocal engineer
 Nakajin – acoustic guitar
 FRED – producer, keys, synths, drum programming
 Demi Lovato – vocals
 Mitch Allan – vocals engineer
 Camille Purcell – backing vocals
 Steve Mac – producer, keyboards
 Sean Paul – vocals
 Anne-Marie – vocals
 Caroline Ailin – backing vocals
 Kelly Barnes – additional vocals
 Chris Laws – vocals engineer
 Dann Pursey – vocals engineer
 Hal Ritson – vocals engineer
 Braimah Kanneh-Mason – violin
 Anthony Leung – strings engineer
 Ellie Goulding – vocals
 Jason Elliott – vocals engineer
 Mark Knight – assistant vocals engineer
 Yasmin Green – backing vocals, vocals
 Romans – vocal production, backing vocals
 Sam Skirrow – fretless bass
 Kyle – vocals
 Big Boi – vocals
 Keith Gretlein – vocals engineer, engineer
 Collin Kadlec – assistant vocals engineer
 Renegade El Rey – vocals engineer
 John Ryan – backing vocals, guitar, producer, programming
 ILYA – producer, drums, keys, guitar
 Tove Styrke – vocals
 Stefflon Don – vocals
 Simon Nordberg – vocals engineer
 Rymez – vocals engineer
 Bradley Giroux – assistant engineer
 Craig David – vocals
 Lotus IV – producer, keys, shire flute
 Rita Ora – vocals
 David Simpson – assistant vocals engineer
 Julia Michaels – vocals
 Rob Cohen – vocals engineer
 Alma – vocals
 Kalle Keskikuru – vocals engineer
 LaDonna Harley-Peters – backing vocals
 Sharlene Hector – backing vocals
 Vula Malinga – backing vocals
 MNEK – backing vocals
 Julian Bunetta – producer, drum programming, programming
 Jeff Gunnell – engineer
 The Invisible Men – producer
 Salt Wives – producer
 Charli XCX – vocals
 Bhad Bhabie – vocals
 John Costello – assistant vocals engineer
 Jon Shave – vocals engineer, keyboards, programming
 Josh Collins – vocals engineer
 George Astasio – keyboards, programming
 Alex Oriet – keyboards, programming
 Jason Pebworth – keyboards, programming
 David Phelan – keyboards, programming
 Davido – vocals
 Love Ssega – vocals
 Guy Kastav – vocals engineer
 Liam Mugwanya – vocals engineer
 Adam Stokes – assistant strings engineer
 Maxwell Cook – additional strings arrangement
 Louisa Johnson – vocals
 AWA – backing vocals
 Neil Amin-Smith – violin
 Stuart Hawkes – mastering

Recording studio locations

 Track 1 recorded at Club Ralph, London; Metropolis Studios, London
 Track 2 recorded at Club Ralph, London; Metropolis Studios, London; RAK Studios, London and Westlake Studios, Los Angeles
 Track 3 recorded at Club Ralph, London; Downtown Music Studios, New York; Muscle Shoals Sound Studio, Alabama; RAK Studios, London and Tileyard Studios, London
 Track 4 recorded at Club Ralph, London; The Crypt Studio, London and Rokstone Studios, London
 Track 5 recorded at Club Ralph, London; Kore Studios, London and RAK Studios, London
 Track 6 recorded at Club Ralph, London; and Nightingale Studios, London
 Track 7 recorded at Club Ralph, London; Enemy Dojo, Calabasas, CA; Henson Studios, Los Angeles and Stankonia Recording Studios, Atlanta, Georgia
 Track 8 recorded at Club Ralph, London; MXM Studios, Los Angeles; Northbound Studios, Stockholm; Soho Recording Studios, London and Wolf Cousins Studios, Stockholm
 Track 9 recorded at Club Ralph, London and Henson Studios, Los Angeles
 Track 10 recorded at Club Ralph, London; The Crypt Studio, Ldon; Lotus Lounge, Los Angeles; RAK Studios, London and Westlake Studios, Los Angeles
 Track 11 recorded at Club Ralph, London and Westlake Recording Studios, Los Angeles
 Track 12 recorded at Clean Bandit tour bus, Lokeren; Club Ralph, London and Fried Studios, Helsinki
 Mixed at Club Ralph, London

Charts

Weekly charts

Year-end charts

Certifications

Release history

References

2018 albums
Atlantic Records albums
Clean Bandit albums
Albums produced by Ilya Salmanzadeh
Albums produced by Fred Again